The Mangarla, or Mangala, are an Aboriginal Australian people of Western Australia. The Mangarla people traditionally lived in the north-western area of the Great Sandy Desert, west of the Karajarri people, east of the Walmajarri, with the Juwaliny and Yulparija to the south. Many Mangarla people now live in Jarlmadangah and Bidyadanga.

Mangarla language

The Mangarla language is one of the Marrngu languages of the Pama–Nyungan family. Two dialect varieties of their tongue are attested, Kakutu/Kakurtu and Ngulatu/Ngulartu. Mangarla is an endangered language, with less than 20 native speakers according to a 2002 census. The Pallottine Catholic priest Father Kevin McKelson (1926–2011), known to the 5 tribes whose languages he mastered as Japulu (father) compiled the first dictionary of the language in 1998, a work which formed the basis for a dictionary co-authored with Albert Burgman in 2005.

History of contact
The Mangarla, like the Walmajarri, Wangkatjungka and Nyigina. were bundled together by the early white colonizers as a "desert mob" because of the arid territory they lived in. Starting from around 1885, when pastoralists began to use their territory for grazing stock, many men from the Mangarla tribe were rounded up to work as jackaroos, in exchange for an annual pay of, according to native tradition, a pair of boots, a shirt and trousers., a situation that descendants say persisted until the 1967 referendum and constitutional amendment by the Holt Government established the principle of equal pay, after which many lost their jobs.

Native title

See also
Ngurrara, a grouping of peoples of language groups including Mangarla

Notes and references

Notes

References

Aboriginal peoples of Western Australia
Broome, Western Australia